The Eleventh Government of the Republic of Croatia was the Croatian Government cabinet led by Prime Minister Jadranka Kosor. It was announced on 6 July 2009 and its term ended on 23 December 2011. The cabinet came into existence after Prime Minister Ivo Sanader abruptly resigned on 1 July 2009, designating Kosor as his successor and making her the first woman to serve as Prime Minister since Croatia gained independence in 1991.  It was succeeded by the Cabinet of Zoran Milanović following the centre-left Kukuriku coalition's success in the 2011 parliamentary elections.

The cabinet represented parties from the ruling coalition formed following the 2007 parliamentary elections:

Croatian Democratic Union (HDZ)
Croatian Social Liberal Party (HSLS)
Independent Democratic Serb Party (SDSS)
Croatian Peasant Party (HSS)

Motions of confidence

Party breakdown 
Party breakdown of cabinet ministers (23 December 2011):

Changes from the Cabinet of Ivo Sanader II
 Božidar Pankretić, the former Minister of Agriculture, Fisheries and Rural Development switched posts with Petar Čobanković, the former Minister of Regional Development, Forestry and Water Management.
 Tomislav Ivić was appointed new Minister of Family, Veterans' Affairs and Intergenerational Solidarity, to fill in the vacant seat after former minister Jadranka Kosor became Prime Minister.
 Bianca Matković was appointed Minister without portfolio.
 New Ministry for Public Administration was formed, with Davorin Mlakar appointed minister.
 Former Minister of Science, Education and Sports Dragan Primorac, who also stepped down the day after Sanader's resignation, was replaced by Radovan Fuchs only days before the Kosor cabinet was officially announced.
 Although initially retained as Minister of Economy, Labour and Entrepreneurship, Damir Polančec resigned three months later on 30 October 2009 and was replaced by Đuro Popijač in November.
 Bianca Matković, who was appointed Minister without portfolio in Kosor's cabinet, was relieved from her post in March 2010. Since no one was appointed to replace her, her post was also terminated.
In May 2010 Ivan Šimonović was appointed United Nations Assistant Secretary-General for Human Rights. Following the appointment, Šimonović was replaced by Dražen Bošnjaković on 7 July 2010. Bošnjaković previously held the post of state secretary with the Ministry of Justice.
In July 2010 the Croatian Social Liberal Party (HSLS) decided to leave the ruling coalition. As a result of this, Đurđa Adlešič stepped down from her post of Deputy Prime Minister.
In December 2010 the government underwent a major reconstruction, which came into effect after the new appointments were approved in a parliament session held on 29 December:
Ivan Šuker (HDZ) was replaced by Martina Dalić (HDZ) as Minister of Finance
Branko Vukelić (HDZ) was replaced by Davor Božinović (HDZ) as Minister of Defence
Marina Matulović-Dropulić (HDZ) was replaced by Branko Bačić (HDZ) as Minister of Environmental Protection, Physical Planning and Construction
Božo Biškupić (HDZ) was replaced by Jasen Mesić (HDZ) as Minister of Culture
In addition, three new Deputy Prime Ministers were appointed - Domagoj Milošević was named Deputy Prime Minister in charge of major investment projects, Minister of Agriculture, Fisheries and Rural Development Petar Čobanković was named Deputy Prime Minister in charge of the economy, and Minister of Foreign Affairs Gordan Jandroković was appointed Deputy Prime Minister.

List of ministers and portfolios
Some periods in the table below start before 6 July 2009 because some ministers also served in the Cabinet of Ivo Sanader II (12 January 2008 – 6 July 2009) and Cabinet of Ivo Sanader I (23 December 2003 – 12 January 2008). 
In December 2010 the cabinet had six Deputy Prime Ministers: for Domagoj Ivan Milošević and Slobodan Uzelac these were their only posts in the cabinet, while Darko Milinović, Božidar Pankretić, Petar Čobanković and Gordan Jandroković served as both Deputy Prime Ministers and ministers of their respective portfolios.
In the following table former members of the cabinet are listed in italic script and current Deputy Prime Ministers are indicated by "(d)".

Notes
nb 1.  Đuro Popijač was originally appointed as a non-party minister in November 2009, but then joined HDZ while in office in August 2010.
<div style="font-size: 95%;">
nb 2.  Tomislav Karamarko was originally appointed as a non-party minister in October 2008, but then joined HDZ while in office in September 2011.

Standing in opinion polls

References

External links
Official website of the Croatian Government
Chronology of Croatian cabinets at Hidra.hr 

Kosor, Jadranka
2009 establishments in Croatia
2011 disestablishments in Croatia
Cabinets established in 2009
Cabinets disestablished in 2011